Robert Dodds (1 July 1923 – after 1948) was an English footballer who made 34 appearances in the Football League playing as a wing half for Darlington. He went on to play non-league football for clubs including Stockton.

References

1923 births
Year of death missing
Footballers from Gateshead
English footballers
Association football wing halves
Darlington F.C. players
Stockton F.C. players
English Football League players